Chansons drôles de d'autres is the name of the third album by québécois comedy duo Crampe en masse consisting of comedy songs covers.

Track listing

2000 albums
Crampe en masse albums
2000s comedy albums